Rayane Bensetti (born 9 April 1993 in Caluire-et-Cuire) is a French actor. He is well known for being the winner of the fifth season of Danse avec les stars with the dancer .

Early life
As a child, he starred in commercials, for example Carrefour,  and Toys "R" Us.

He started on TV in 2008 by being an extra on Il faut sauver Saïd.

Career
He later on had a few roles, as TV movie  and movie  in 2011.

His breakout role is Benjamin Vidal on TV series  which he embodies since 2013.

In 2014, he was part of the fifth season of Danse avec les stars, which he won with dancer mentor . They later on toured for it. He and Philippe Lellouche joined the TV series Clem as two new main characters for the fifth season which was broadcast in March 2015.

In February 2015 he gave an interview in which he announced that he will be in the next Luc Besson movie.

Filmography

Theater

Music videos

References

External links

1993 births
21st-century French male actors
Living people
French male film actors
French male television actors
People from Lyon Metropolis
French people of Algerian descent
Danse avec les stars winners
21st-century French dancers